Cino is a comune in the province of Sondrio in Italy.

"Cino" may also refer to:

 Cino da Pistoia (1270-1336), an Italian jurist and poet
 "Cino", a 1908 poem about Cino da Pistoia by Ezra Pound
 Cino Del Duca (1899-1967), an Italian-French businessman
 Cino Cinelli (1916-2001), an Italian cyclist
 Daud Yordan (born 1987), an Indonesian boxer nicknamed "Cino"
 Beppe Cino (born 1947), Italian director and screenwriter
 Chief innovation officer, responsible for managing the innovation process inside an organization